Massoia lactone is an alkyl lactone derived from the bark of the Massoia tree (Cryptocaria massoia) which is found in Papua, Indonesia though the compound can also be found as a component of cane sugar molasses, cured tobacco, and the essential oil of Sweet Osmanthus (Osmanthus fragrans). Chemically, massoia lactone can be obtained as a minor product in transfer hydrogenation of 6-amyl-α-pyrone.

Known in the late 18th and early 19th centuries as massoy bark, massoia essential oil was once widely used as a natural coconut flavouring. Natural massoia lactone has been largely superseded by a synthetic alternative because the extraction process is expensive and the process of removing the bark kills the tree.

Massoia lactone has an odour that is described as sweet, coconut meat, lactonic, creamy, milky and waxy and, at a dilution of 20 ppm, a taste described as creamy, coconut, green, and slightly fruity.

References 

Lactones
Dihydropyrans